Michael Preston (born June 1, 1989) is an American football wide receiver who is currently a free agent. He was signed by the Tennessee Titans as an undrafted free agent in 2011. He played college football at Heidelberg in Tiffin, Ohio.

Early years
Preston played high school football for the Euclid High School Panthers. He did not play on the varsity team until his senior year, when he recorded 12 receptions and two receiving touchdowns. He graduated in 2007.

College career
Preston played for the Heidelberg Student Princes from 2007 to 2010. He appeared in 39 games, recording 167 receptions for 2,748 yards and 27 touchdowns. He was named First-team All-Ohio Athletic Conference in 2009 and 2010.

Professional career
Preston was rated the 154th best wide receiver in the 2011 NFL Draft by NFLDraftScout.com.

Utah Blaze
Preston signed with the Utah Blaze on June 27, 2011 after going undrafted in the 2011 NFL Draft. He played in three games, recording 26 receptions for 319 yards and five touchdowns. He was placed on Other League Exempt by the Blaze on July 26, 2011.

Tennessee Titans
Preston was signed by the Tennessee Titans on July 26, 2011. He was released by the Titans on September 2 and signed to the team's practice squad on September 4, 2011. He was re-signed by the Titans on January 2, 2012. Preston was released by the Titans on August 31 and signed to the team's practice squad on  September 1, 2012. He was promoted to the active roster on December 7, 2012. He was waived by the Titans on October 16, 2013, and signed to the team's practice squad on October 16, 2013. Preston was promoted to the active roster on December 7, 2013. He recorded three receptions for 27 yards and the first two touchdown catches of his career on December 15, 2013 against the Arizona Cardinals. He was released by the Titans on August 31, 2014. Preston played in 11 games during his NFL career, catching 10 passes for 96 yards and 2 touchdowns.

San Jose SaberCats
Preston signed with the San Jose SaberCats on October 23, 2014.

Miami Dolphins
Preston was signed by the Miami Dolphins on January 7, 2015. He was released by the team  on August 23, 2015.

Hamilton Tiger-Cats
Preston signed with the Hamilton Tiger-Cats on April 20, 2016. He was released by the team on May 3, 2016.

Cleveland Gladiators
On March 21, 2017, Preston was assigned to the Cleveland Gladiators. He earned Second-team All-Arena honors in 2017.

References

External links

Tennessee Titans bio
Just Sports Stats

1989 births
Living people
American football wide receivers
Canadian football wide receivers
Heidelberg Student Princes football players
Utah Blaze players
Tennessee Titans players
San Jose SaberCats players
Miami Dolphins players
Hamilton Tiger-Cats players
Cleveland Gladiators players
African-American players of American football
African-American players of Canadian football
Players of American football from Cleveland
Players of Canadian football from Cleveland
People from Euclid, Ohio
21st-century African-American sportspeople
20th-century African-American people